Catharine Coleborne (born 27 October 1967) is an Australian medical historian and academic administrator. She is the Head of School and Dean of Arts at the University of Newcastle and a fellow of the Academy of the Social Sciences in Australia.

Life 
Coleborne was born in 1967. She took her first degree at the University of Melbourne before going on to study "Madness" to gain a doctorate from La Trobe University in Melbourne. She looked at gender and institutional confinement for the mentally ill during the nineteenth-century when Australia was part of the British Empire.

Coleborne has continued to study madness and she has published books and papers on her research.

She has published four books as sole author including Madness in the Family: Insanity and Institutions in the Australasian Colonial World, 1860–1914 in 2009 when she was an Associate Professor at Waikato University.

In 2015  she became the Head of School and Dean of Arts, University of Newcastle. She was elected to be a fellow of the Academy of the Social Sciences in Australia in 2021 together with 36 others including David Kalisch, Nisvan Erkal and Lyn Parker in 2021 In that year she was also the President of the Australasian Council of Deans of Arts and Social Sciences (DASSH) and she was a keynote speaker at the National Association of Graduate Careers Advisory Services National Conference.

Publications 

 Madness in the Family: Insanity and Institutions in the Australasian Colonial World, 1860–1914

References 

1967 births
Living people
La Trobe University alumni
Fellows of the Academy of the Social Sciences in Australia
Academic staff of the University of Newcastle (Australia)
Australian medical historians